The 3rd Justice and Development Party Ordinary Congress was a party convention of the governing Turkish Justice and Development Party (AKP) that took place on 3 October 2009.

The AKP's founding party leader Recep Tayyip Erdoğan stood as the only candidate for the party leadership, with 1,463 registered delegates voting in the election. Erdoğan was re-elected as leader with 1,362 votes. The congress was held seven months after the AKP emerged as the first party in the 29 March 2009 local elections.

Date and venue
The congress was held in the ASKI Sport Hall in the capital city of Ankara. The date of 3 October 2009 was set due to the AKP's usual timetable of holding its conventions in the Autumn every three years. The previous ordinary congress took place in 2006.

Agenda
The agenda widely centred on the AKP's policy of 'democratisation', which aimed to win over many Kurdish supporters in the south-east of Turkey through more inclusive policies that increase said citizen's rights as a minority. The main opposition Republican People's Party (CHP) did not send an observer, though other smaller parties were represented at the congress. During his speech, it was observed that Erdoğan did not read out a pre-written script containing criticism of the Kurdish nationalist Democratic Society Party (DTP).

In a propaganda film featuring Erdoğan's overseas trips as Prime Minister, the crowd only applauded footage that showed US President Barack Obama. Both German Chancellor Angela Merkel and the Ukrainian Prime Minister Yulia Tymoshenko sent messages of support to the congress.

Leadership election

Candidates
Recep Tayyip Erdoğan, Prime Minister of Turkey since 2003

Results

Central Decision Executive Board election
The following members were elected to the Central Decision Executive Board (MKYK). The number of votes they received is shown in brackets.

See also
2014 Justice and Development Party Extraordinary Congress

References

External links
AKP website in English

2009 elections in Turkey
Elections in Turkey
Justice and Development Party (Turkey)
October 2009 events in Turkey